Pablo García (born 16 September 1967) is a Spanish luger. He competed at the 1988 Winter Olympics and the 1992 Winter Olympics.

References

1967 births
Living people
Spanish male lugers
Olympic lugers of Spain
Lugers at the 1988 Winter Olympics
Lugers at the 1992 Winter Olympics
Place of birth missing (living people)